The Stuttgart Formation is a geologic formation in Germany. It preserves fossils dating back to the Carnian stage of the Triassic period.

Fossil content

Temnospondyls 

 Cyclotosaurus buechneri
 C. robustus
 Hyperokynodon keuperinus
 Mastodonsaurus andriani
 Metoposaurus diagnosticus
 Gerrothorax sp.

Therapsids 
 Kannemeyeriiformes indet.

Reptiles 
 Zanclodon arenaceus
 Z. subcylindrodon
 Archosauria indet.

Fish 
 Lissodus sp.
 Palaeobates sp.

Invertebrates

 Aviculomyalina angusta
 Cyzicus laxitextus
 C. cf. dorsorectus
 C. minutus
 Homomya bilonga
 H. simplex
 Myalina rotundata
 Mytilus acutefinitus
 M. avirostrum
 M. hasta
 M. minutus
 M. peregrinus
 M. sulmensis
 Lithophaga buchhornensis
 L. lennachensis
 L. producta
 L. vermiculata
 Mactromya altera
 M. equisetitis
 Modiolus eberstadtensis
 M. formosissimus
 M. mediocarinatus
 M. minalatus
 M. parallelus
 M. parvoblongus
 M. suprarectus
 M. transiens
 M. triangulus
 Myoconcha aperina
 M. longaperina
 M. ovulum
 M. scalprosa
 M. cf. woehrmanni
 M. aff. aquatensis
 Parallelodon beyrichii
 Pinna mediokeuperina
 Pleuromya curta
 P. nitens
 Schafhaeutlia aff. liscaviensis
 Thracia keuperina
 Trigonodus cf. grandis
 T. pygmaeus
 T. singularis
 T. wuertembergicus
 Asmussia sp.
 Gervillia sp.
 ?Gryphaea sp.
 Myoconcha sp.
 Mytilus sp.
 Trigonodus sp.

Flora 

 Clathrophyllum meriani
 Danaeopsis marantacea
 D. rumphi
 Desmiophyllum imhoffi
 Dioonitocarpidium pennaeforme
 Neocalamites meriani
 Pagiophyllum foetterlei
 Voltziopsis coburgensis
 Widdringtonites keuperianus
 Equisetites sp.
 Pterophyllum sp.

See also 

 List of fossiliferous stratigraphic units in Germany
 List of fossiliferous stratigraphic units in Switzerland
 Benkersandstein, contemporaneous ichnofossiliferous formation of Bavaria
 Chañares Formation, fossiliferous formation of the Ischigualasto-Villa Unión Basin, Argentina
 Candelária Formation, contemporaneous fossiliferous formation of the Paraná Basin, Brazil
 Molteno Formation, contemporaneous fossiliferous formation of Lesotho and South Africa
 Pebbly Arkose Formation, contemporaneous fossiliferous formation of Botswana, Zambia and Zimbabwe
 Denmark Hill Insect Bed, contemporaneous fossiliferous unit of Queensland, Australia
 Madygen Formation, contemporaneous Lagerstätte of Kyrgyzstan

References

Bibliography 

 
 
 
 
 
 
 
 
 

Geologic formations of Germany
Geologic formations of Switzerland
Triassic System of Europe
Triassic Germany
Triassic Switzerland
Carnian Stage
Sandstone formations
Shale formations
Fluvial deposits
Lacustrine deposits
Lagoonal deposits
Paleontology in Germany
Formations
Formations
Formations